Homi F. Mobed (1928 or 1929 – 14 April 2015) was a Pakistani cricketer who played seven matches of first-class cricket for Karachi teams between December 1956 and October 1957.

Mobed was an all-rounder: a right-handed batsman and leg-spin bowler. His most successful match was a semi-final of the Quaid-e-Azam Trophy in 1956-57, when he batted at number nine for Karachi Whites against Karachi Blues and made 96 in a team total of 762, and also took three wickets, helping Karachi Whites to an innings victory. A Parsi, he died of cardiac arrest at the Parsi General Hospital in Karachi on 14 April 2015, aged 86.

The first-class cricketer and umpire Minocher Mobed was a relative: either his father or his uncle.

References

External links
 
 Homi Mobed at CricketArchive

1920s births
2015 deaths
Pakistani cricketers
Karachi cricketers
Parsi people
Pakistani Zoroastrians
People from Karachi